Grim Prairie Tales is a 1990 American independent horror Western film, written and directed by Wayne Coe, and starring an ensemble cast including James Earl Jones, Brad Dourif, Will Hare, Marc McClure, William Atherton, and Lisa Eichhorn.

It is an anthology film of four separate stories, told by two travellers around a prairie campfire. Morrison (Jones) is a grizzled bounty hunter carrying a body, while Farley Deeds (Dourif) is a clerk on the way to a romantic reunion with his wife.

Synopsis
The first story, told by Morrison, is about an Indian tribe's revenge against a grouchy old man (Will Hare) who desecrates their burial ground. When that tale fails to impress Deeds, the second story, also by Morrison, tells about a man (Marc McClure) who helps a seductive seemingly pregnant demon woman (Michelle Joyner) in trouble. Deeds, disgusted by the second story, responds with the only non-supernatural story of the three, about a homesteader family whose father (William Atherton) is forced to participate in a lynch mob. Finally, after feeling challenged by Deeds' story, Morrison tells about a gunslinger (Scott Paulin) haunted by a gunman (Bruce Fischer) he has killed in a shootout.
The next morning, Deeds points out to Morrison that the body he's carrying doesn't match the description on the wanted poster; Morrison cuts the body loose and rides out.

Cast 
 James Earl Jones as Morrison
 Brad Dourif as Farley Deeds
 Will Hare as Lee
 Michelle Joyner as Jenny
 Marc McClure as Tom
 William Atherton as Arthur
 Lisa Eichhorn as Maureen
 Wendy J. Cooke as Eva
 Scott Paulin as Martin
 Tom Simcox as Horn
 Bruce M. Fischer as Colochez

Production 

The film was the sole directorial outing from Coe, a storyboard artist and set decorator. At one point, Coe was considering making a sequel entitled Grim Prairie Tales: Rescue Party. The film was the feature film debut of future Academy Award-winning cinematographer Janusz Kamiński, who at the time worked as a lighting technician and 2nd unit director under fellow DP Phedon Papamichael.

Atherton appeared in the lead role in the 1978 NBC television western miniseries Centennial. Tom Simcox appeared in Grim Prairie Tales as the wealthy rancher Horn. In an acting career from 1962–1991, he appeared in eight Gunsmoke episodes and in other television Westerns.

Reception
At the time of its cinema and subsequent video release it was marketed as a straight horror, and reviews of the time consequently focused on its lack of scares.
Stephen Holden from New York Times wrote, "Grim Prairie Tales aspires to be a sort of western Twilight Zone, but the stories it tells are so flat and lacking in tension and atmosphere that the movie generates no tingles." Hal Hinson from Washington Post offered the film similar criticism, stating that the film wasn't particularly scary.

Actors on set and audiences Coe subsequently encountered consistently viewed the film as a feminist western rather than a horror, and it has a cult following based on that interpretation.

In the UK its reputation as a cult classic was cemented by its inclusion, in 1993, in the Moviedrome TV strand, where it was introduced by Alex Cox.

References

External links
 
 

1990 films
1990 horror films
1990s Western (genre) horror films
American Western (genre) horror films
American horror anthology films
American supernatural horror films
Native American horror films
1990s English-language films
1990s American films